The Treaty of the Bogue was a treaty between China and the United Kingdom of Great Britain and Ireland, concluded in October 1843 to supplement the previous Treaty of Nanking. The treaty's key provisions granted extraterritoriality and most favored nation status to Britain.

Background
In order to conclude the First Opium War, imperial commissioner Qiying and Henry Pottinger concluded the Treaty of Nanjing aboard the British warship HMS Cornwallis in 1842 in Nanjing on the behalf of Britain and the Chinese Qing dynasty.  The treaty became the first of a series of commercial treaties, often referred to as "unequal treaties", which China concluded against its wishes with Western powers.

Terms
During the negotiations in Nanjing, China and Britain had agreed that a supplementary treaty be concluded, and on 22July 1843 the two parties promulgated the  "General Regulations of Trade with Britain and China" in Canton (Guangzhou). These regulations were included in the "Treaty of the Bogue," which Qiying and Pottinger signed on 8October 1843 on the Bogue outside Canton.

The treaty laid down detailed regulations for Sino-British trade and specified terms under which Britons could reside in the newly opened ports of Shanghai, Ningbo, Xiamen (Amoy), Fuzhou, and Canton. While Britons were allowed to buy property in the treaty ports and reside there with their families, they were not allowed to travel to the interior of China or trade there.

The treaty also granted extraterritorial privileges to British subjects and most Favored Nation status to Great Britain, which meant that the latter would enjoy any privilege granted to other powers.

Aftermath
In China, the treaty is widely regarded as an imperialist one, which paved the way for the subjugation of China to Western imperialism. The treaty consolidated the "opening" of China to foreign trade in the wake of the First Opium War and allowed Britons to reside in parts of China, which had not been opened to foreigners before. In 1845, local Qing authorities and the British authorities promulgated the Shanghai Land regulations, which paved the way for the foundation of the Shanghai International Settlement. Similar agreements were concluded in other treaty ports, which created a social divide between the Europeans and Chinese citizens in the cities.

See also
 Unequal treaties
 First and Second Opium Wars
 Imperialism in Asia
 Anglo-Chinese relations

References
Fairbank, John King. Trade and Diplomacy on the China Coast: The Opening of the Treaty Ports, 1842-1854. 2 vols. Cambridge, MA: Harvard University Press, 1953.
Hertslet, Edward, ed. Treaties, &C., between Great Britain and China; and between China and Foreign Powers; Orders in Council, Rules, Regulations, Acts of Parliament, Decrees, and Notifications Affecting British Interests in China, in Force on the 1st January, 1896. 2 vols. London: Homson, 1896.

Bogue
Bogue
China–United Kingdom relations
1843 in China
1843 in the United Kingdom
1843 treaties
Bogue
1843 in British law